Disembodied means having no material body, being immaterial incorporeal or insubstantial. The name Disembodied or The Disembodied may refer to:

 Disembodied (band), an American metalcore band
 Disembodied (Buckethead album), a 1997 album  by Buckethead under the name Death Cube K
 The Disembodied (film), a 1957 science fiction horror film

See also
 Immaterial (disambiguation)